The Nokia 6301, approved by the FCC for the US market in January 2008, (RM-323 for the North America market, RM-322 for the European market) is a triband GSM mobile phone. The North American model 6301b is equipped with 850/1800/1900 MHz bands. The European model 6301 is equipped with 900/1800/1900 MHz bands.

The 6301 has SMS and MMS 1.2, and is capable of instant messaging. It has a standard 12 button numeric keypad, a five way navigation key and four additional keys on its face. It has a side volume key and a top mounted dedicated power key.

The bulk of the area above the keypad is taken up with the 2.0" TFT display, 320 x 240 pixels with up to 16.7 Million colors. It is a small device, weighing 3.27 oz and is 4.20 x 1.72 x 0.52 in. Power is provided by a BL-4C 860 mAh Li-ion unit providing up to 3.5 hours of use per charge.

While nearly identical in appearance to the Nokia 6300, there are significant differences between the two.

Major features

UMA 
Unlicensed Mobile Access (UMA) allows the mobile device to utilize a wireless router to make phone calls.  The phone and router are recognized as being similar to a phone and GSM tower by the carrier's system. This allows for seamless handoffs between the router and the GSM tower at the point where the device is no longer in range of the router.

802.11b/g WiFi 
A WiFi connection for data transfer to the service provider means downloading content such as ringtones, games and wallpapers wallpapers moves considerably more quicker than EDGE or GPRS speeds.

Music capability 
An FM radio and multi-format music player are included in the build. Stereo output is accomplished through the 2.5 mm Nokia AV port at the bottom of the device or through the Bluetooth A2DP provision. Operation of the FM radio requires a wired device be attached to the AV port as it functions as the antenna for the radio. The music player supports MIDI, AAC, AAC+, enhanced AAC+, MP3, and WMA files. There is an equalizer to allow for some adjustment of the sound's tonal quality.

Photography and videography 

A 2.0 megapixel CMOS sensor is mated to a fixed focus lens without auxiliary lighting. Maximum resolution is 1600 x 1200. Digital zoom allows for in camera cropping prior to taking the shot. The still image camera has High, Normal and Basic quality settings. Image size choices are 160 x 120, 320 x 240, 640 480, 800 x 600, 1280 x 960 and 1600 x 1200. Available effects are Normal, False color, Grayscale, Sepia, Negative and Solarize. White Balance choices are Auto, Daylight, Tungsten and Fluorescent.

Video is shot through the same lens as still images. Video resolution choices are 176 x 144 and 128 x 96 and appear to be 15 frames per second. Video clip length choices are Maximum and Default. Default will produce a clip suitable for sending via MMS, or roughly less than 300KB. Other menu choices for video mirror those for still images. Both still and video images may be saved either to the phone memory or to the storage card.

Other features

Browsing 
The 6301 includes an xHTML browser for internet browsing. It is capable of displaying many web pages as intended with some side to side scrolling. It handles mobile designed web pages without scrolling. It handles google.com both in mobile and classic form without incident. The phone's rendering of Nokia.com was different from a desktop browser's rendering, which appears to strictly be an Adobe Flash Player related issue.

Connectivity 
There is a mini USB plug behind a cover at the bottom of the device. Nokia does not specify if this device is USB 1.0, 1.1 or 2.0 compliant. 

The Bluetooth radio is another avenue for connection. This device implements Bluetooth 2.0 + EDR supporting these profiles: A2DP, AVRCP, DUN, FTP, GAP, GAVDP, GOEP, HFP, HSP, OPP, SAP, SDAP, SPP.

Sideloading of information may be accomplished by way of the microSD or micro SDHC card. This device supports up to 4 gigabytes.

Memory 
Device memory is up to 30 megabytes for end user purposes. Flash memory of 64 MB for handling the device firmware is also present.

Nokia 6300
The Nokia 6300 is virtually identical in exterior appearance to the Nokia 6301. There are several internal and functional differences causing it to occupy a different functional niche than is occupied by the Nokia 6301.

Memory 
The user memory available is 7.8 MB. The microSD storage capacity is 2 GB.

Connectivity 
Connectivity is limited to Bluetooth,  There is no 802.11b/g (WiFi) associated with this device.

Identifying the 6300 and 6301

The battery compartment label in these devices has information about the device. This will include the Model, the type and the FCC ID. The list following summarizes that information and the major differences among the various types.

European/Asian 6300
 Model 6300
 Type: RM-217
 FCC ID: PPIRM-217
 900/1800/1900 MHz - no WiFi
 7.8 megabytes user memory
 2 gigabytes microSD maximum

North American 6300
 Model 6300b
 Type: RM-222
 FCC ID: PPIRM-222
 850/1800/1900 MHz - no WiFi
 7.8 megabytes user memory
 2 gigabytes microSD maximum

European/Asian 6301
 Model 6301
 Type: RM-322
 FCC ID: PPIRM-322
 900/1800/1900 MHz + WiFi
 30 megabytes user memory
 4 gigabytes micro SDHC maximum

North American 6301
 Model 6301b
 Type: RM-323
 FCC ID: PPIRM-323
 850/1800/1900 MHz + WiFi
 30 megabytes user memory
 4 gigabytes micro SDHC maximum

References

6301